Pryorsburg (also Pryors) is an unincorporated community and census-designated place (CDP) in Graves County, Kentucky, United States. As of the 2010 census the population was 311.

Demographics

References

Census-designated places in Graves County, Kentucky
Census-designated places in Kentucky